Aaron Lyle (November 17, 1759 – September 24, 1825) was a member of the U.S. House of Representatives from Pennsylvania.

Aaron Lyle was born in Mount Bethel, Pennsylvania.  He served in the American Revolutionary War, and was a member of the Pennsylvania House of Representatives from 1797 to 1801.  He served in the Pennsylvania State Senate from 1802 to 1804.  He served as a commissioner of Washington County, Pennsylvania, from 1806 to 1809.

Lyle was elected as a Republican to the Eleventh and to the three succeeding Congresses.  He resumed agricultural pursuits and served as an original trustee of Jefferson  (later Washington and Jefferson) College in Canonsburg, Pennsylvania, from 1802 to 1822.  He died at Cross Creek, Pennsylvania.  Interment in the Old Cemetery.

References

Sources

Aaron Lyle at The Political Graveyard

1759 births
1825 deaths
Democratic-Republican Party members of the United States House of Representatives from Pennsylvania
Members of the Pennsylvania House of Representatives
Pennsylvania state senators
People of Pennsylvania in the American Revolution
Politicians from Northampton County, Pennsylvania
Washington & Jefferson College trustees